Elattoneura tenax is a species of damselfly in the family Platycnemididae known commonly as the red-striped threadtail. It is endemic to Sri Lanka.

See also
 List of odonates of Sri Lanka

References

Platycnemididae
Damselflies of Sri Lanka
Endemic fauna of Sri Lanka